Overseal and Moira railway station served the village of Overseal, Derbyshire, England, from 1873 to 1890 on the Ashby and Nuneaton Joint Railway.

History
The station was opened on 1 September 1873 by the Midland Railway but only served by the London and North Western Railway. The station was renamed in March 1883, when Moira was dropped from the name. As the station has been built originally as a terminus station until running powers were secured from Midland's Burton to Ashby line, it closed on 1 July 1890.

References

Disused railway stations in Derbyshire
Former Midland Railway stations
Railway stations in Great Britain opened in 1873
Railway stations in Great Britain closed in 1890
1873 establishments in England
1890 disestablishments in England